Jahongir Abdumominov (born 9 February 1993), also known as Jaha, is an Uzbek professional footballer who plays for Viettel. He was also on Uzbekistan national football team.

Career

Club
On 19 July 2018, Abdumominov signed a one-year contract with FC Istiklol.

On 11 January 2019, Abdumominov signed a one-year contract with Persija Jakarta. In mid-February, it was announced that his contract was terminated because the club weren't convinced by his performances throughout the pre-season. Abdumominov then joined FK Buxoro for the 2019 season.

On 27 January 2021, Jakhongir Abdumuminov signed a contract with Viettel after he had 2 weeks quarantine for 2 weeks according to anti-epidemic regulations. He had an opening match with victory 3-1 with Viettel aganist Becamex Binh Duong.

Career statistics

Club

International

Statistics accurate as of match played 15 August 2012

Honours

Club
 Istiklol
 Tajik League (1):2018
 Tajik Cup (1):2018

 Viettel 
V.League 1 (1): 2020

References

1993 births
Living people
Uzbekistani footballers
Uzbekistan international footballers
Uzbekistan Super League players
Tajikistan Higher League players
FK Mash'al Mubarek players
FC AGMK players
FC Istiklol players
Persija Jakarta players
Buxoro FK players
FK Andijon players
Uzbekistani expatriate footballers
People from Qashqadaryo Region
Expatriate footballers in Tajikistan
Expatriate footballers in Indonesia
Uzbekistani expatriate sportspeople in Indonesia
Association football midfielders